Superliga Femenina de Voleibol 2012–13 was the 44th season since its establishment. The 2012–13 regular season started in November 2012, and finished on March 23, 2013. Championship playoffs began March 29 with semifinal matches and finished on 27 April with the 4th match of the Final.

Defending champions were Valeriano Allès Menorca having defeated Haro Rioja Voley in the championship playoff final from past season.

Haro Rioja Voley won its first ever title of Superliga after defeating 3–1 to Nuchar Tramek Murillo in the Championship playoffs Final.

2012–13 season teams

2012–13 season standings

Championship playoffs

Bracket
To best of three games.

Semifinals

Match 1

|}

Match 2

|}

Match 3

|}

Final

Match 1

|}

Match 2

|}

Match 3

|}

Match 4

|}

Top scorers
(This statistics includes regular season and playoff matches.)

References

External links
Superliga Femenina regular season standings
Superliga Femenina championship playoffs

1ªFemale
2013 in women's volleyball
2013 in Spanish sport
2012 in women's volleyball
2012 in Spanish sport